Kelli Allison Stack (born January 13, 1988) is an American former ice hockey forward, who played for Kunlun Red Star in the Canadian Women's Hockey League. She is a member of the United States women's national ice hockey team. Stack competed for the Boston College Eagles women's ice hockey program and after completing her Olympic commitment, returned to Boston College for her senior year of 2010–11. She was drafted 14th overall by the Boston Blades in the 2011 CWHL Draft.

Playing career

NCAA

On February 8, 2011, with two points in the game against Boston University in the first round of the 2011 Beanpot Tournament, Kelli Stack accumulated 199 points in her career and broke BC's all-time career points record, becoming the new program leader. The previous record had been held by Erin Magee ('99). On January 31, 2011, Kelli Stack became the all-time leading goal scorer in Hockey East Conference history to bring her career total to 65, breaking Jen Hitchcock's (University of New Hampshire) record of 61 goals.

At the conclusion of her career at Boston College, Stack was voted the New England Division I Player of the Year after leading Hockey East in points (56) and goals (34). The Second Team All-American scored two goals to help advance the Eagles to the Frozen Four for the second time in her tenure. The three-time Hockey East Player of the Year accumulated 58 points for the season and concluded her collegiate career as BC's all-time leading scorer with 209 points.

Stack was among the three finalists nominated for the 2011 Patty Kazmaier Award and the first nominee from Boston College. An award of the USA Hockey Foundation, the Patty Kazmaier Memorial Award is annually bestowed upon the top player in NCAA Division I women's ice hockey. Stack was also nominated for the award in 2009. Stack was also a four-time All-Conference selection, the first player to accomplish this feat in the nine-year history of Hockey East.

USA Hockey
Stack played in all five games contested by the Team USA in the 2010 Winter Olympics. She accumulated eight points, five assists and three goals, with four points in the game against Russia. Team USA went on to win a silver medal, losing to Canada in the gold medal game 0–2. In the second game of the 2011 IIHF Eight Nations Tournament, Stack was one of two US players to register a hat trick in a victory over Japan. In the first game of the 2012 IIHF Women's World Championship, she had three assists in a 9–2 victory over Canada. In a game versus Finland at the 2012 Worlds, she scored a hat trick and added three assists in an 11–0 victory.

Stack again played in all five of USA's games at the 2014 Winter Olympics, scoring five points. Team USA won the silver medal, losing to Canada 3–2 in overtime in the gold medal game.

CWHL: Boston Blades
Selected by the Boston Blades in the 2011 CWHL Draft, Stack set a franchise record for most points scored in one season with 42. In round-robin play at the 2012 Clarkson Cup, Stack scored two goals, as the Blades earned a 5–2 victory over the Toronto Furies. During the 2012–13 CWHL season, Stack only played in eight games before suffering a season-ending injury. Despite her injury, she traveled with the Blades to the 2013 Clarkson Cup.

NWHL: Connecticut Whale
On September 24, 2015, it was announced that Stack had signed with the Connecticut Whale of the semi-professional NWHL for the league's inaugural season. In 2016–17, Stack set the franchise record in goals scored with 12 in 16 games played.

CWHL: Kunlun Red Star WIH
The CWHL expanded to have two new teams in Shenzhen as China prepares to host the 2022 Winter Olympics. After being cut from the 2018 USA Olympic team, Stack joined the Kunlun Red Star WIH as a hockey ambassador. Stack earned an assist on the first goal in Red Star WIH history, scored by Zoe Hickel.

Stack led the CWHL in points with 49 in 28 games for Red Star WIH. She appeared with the Red Star in the 2018 Clarkson Cup final where she scored the team's only goal of the game in the second period in a 2–1 loss to the Markham Thunder.

Career statistics

Awards and honors

CWHL
 CWHL First All-Star Team, 2011–12
 CWHL All-Rookie Team, 2011–12
 CWHL Monthly Top Scorer, December 2011
 2018 Angela James Bowl
 2018 CWHL Most Valuable Player Award

NCAA
Hockey East Player of the Week (Week of November 1, 2010)
Hockey East Player of the Week (Week of March 7, 2011)
Hockey East Pure Hockey Player of the Month (October 2010) 
Hockey East Pure Hockey Player of the Month, November 2010
Runner-Up, Hockey East Player of the Month (January 2011) 
2011 Patty Kazmaier Award Nominee
2010–11 Hockey East Army ROTC Three Stars Award: Kelli Stack, Boston College
2010–11 Hockey East Scoring Champion: Kelli Stack, Boston College
2010–11 Cammi Granato Award (Hockey East Player of the Year)
2011 Hockey East All-Tournament team 
2011 Hockey East Tournament MVP
2011 All-Hockey East First Team
2011 Second Team All-America selection
2010–11 New England Women's Player of the Year
2010–11 New England Women's Division I All-Star
Hockey East 10th Anniversary Team selection

IIHF
Best Forward, 2011 4 Nations Cup
Directorate Award, Best Forward, 2012 International Ice Hockey Federation Women's World Championships

USA Hockey
2012 Bob Allen Women's Player of the Year Award

References

External links
 
 Kelli Stack at Boston College Eagles
 Kelli Stack at USA Hockey
 
 
 
 

1988 births
Living people
American women's ice hockey forwards
Angela James Bowl winners
Boston Blades players
Boston College Eagles women's ice hockey players
Connecticut Whale (PHF) players
Ice hockey players from Ohio
Ice hockey players at the 2010 Winter Olympics
Ice hockey players at the 2014 Winter Olympics
Shenzhen KRS Vanke Rays players
Medalists at the 2010 Winter Olympics
Medalists at the 2014 Winter Olympics
Premier Hockey Federation players
Olympic silver medalists for the United States in ice hockey
Sportspeople from Cuyahoga County, Ohio